Barry Hannon (born 2 January 1940) is a former Australian rules footballer who played for the South Melbourne Football Club in the Victorian Football League (VFL).

Notes

External links 

Living people
1940 births
Australian rules footballers from Victoria (Australia)
Sydney Swans players
Echuca Football Club players